Tom or Thomas Leonard may refer to:

Tom Leonard (Irish politician) (1924–2004), Fianna Fáil politician from Dublin, Ireland
Tom Leonard (poet) (1944–2018), Scottish poet
Thomas J. Leonard (1955–2003), founder of Coach University
Tom Leonard (tennis) (born 1948), American former tennis player
Thomas D'Arcy Leonard (1895–1977), Canadian politician and corporate executive
Thomas Arthur Leonard (1864–1948), British social reformer
Thomas H. Leonard (born 1948), British statistician and author
Tom Leonard (Michigan politician) (born 1981), member of the Michigan House of Representatives
Thomas C. Leonard, economics academic
 (born 1981), French football referee

See also